Električni orgazam (Electric Orgasm) is the debut album by Serbian/Yugoslavian Novi talas band Električni orgazam. It was released in 1981 by Jugoton.

Track listing
Music and lyrics by Srđan Gojković except where noted. All songs arranged by Električni Orgazam except where noted.

Personnel
Marina Vulić – bass guitar
Mango (Branko Kuštrin) – drums
Ljubomir Jovanović – guitar
Srđan Gojković – guitar, vocals
Ljubomir Đukić – organ, piano, vocals
Mladen Škalec – engineer

External links

Električni Orgazam albums
1981 debut albums
Punk rock albums by Serbian artists
Punk rock albums by Yugoslav artists
Jugoton albums